ATP phosphohydrolase (steroid-exporting) may refer to:

 Steroid-transporting ATPase, an enzyme
 Xenobiotic-transporting ATPase, an enzyme